Glen Croe is a glen in the heart of the Arrochar Alps on the Cowal Peninsula, in Argyll and Bute, Scotland. The glen is surrounded by large and rugged mountains characterised by huge boulders.  The glen is within the Loch Lomond and The Trossachs National Park.

Geography

Glen Croe is located to the north west of Loch Lomond and Loch Long, draining into the latter. At the head of the glen is the pass leading to Glen Kinglas. The A83 road runs the length of the glen, passing the viewpoint known as Rest & Be Thankful. Glen Croe is situated entirely within the Argyll Forest Park in Cowal. The glen is also within the Loch Lomond and The Trossachs National Park.

The mountains on either side are:

Beinn Ìme
Ben Donich
Beinn Luibhean
The Brack
Beinn an Lochain
The Cobbler

History

The old road through the glen seen in the photograph is part of the military road that ran from Dumbarton to Inveraray. This was built in the 1740s under the supervision of Major William Caulfeild. A stone inscribed Rest & Be Thankful was erected around 1749, after this section of road was completed.

From 1949 until 1970, motor racing events, including hill climbs and rally stages took place here.

Gilleasbaig Mac an t-Saoir composed a song called 'Oran Ghlinne Chro', detailing the sadness he felt when the gamekeeper moved his flock out of the glen to make room for deer and sport hunting in 1914.

See also

Rest and Be Thankful Speed Hill Climb

References

External links

 Engraving of a cavern in Glen Croe by James Fittler in the digitised copy of Scotia Depicta, or the antiquities, castles, public buildings, noblemen and gentlemen's seats, cities, towns and picturesque scenery of Scotland, 1804 at National Library of Scotland
 The Loch Lomond and The Trossachs National Park
 Argyll Forest Park

Valleys of Argyll and Bute
Glens of Scotland
Highlands and Islands of Scotland
Glens of Cowal